Avilés Stadium Club de Fútbol is a Spanish football club based in Avilés, Asturias. Founded in 2015, it plays in Regional Preferente de Asturias, holding home games at Estadio Muro de Zaro, with a capacity of 4,000 people.

History
Avilés Stadium was founded in 2015 by a group of supporters worried about the situation of Real Avilés, owned by unpopular José María Tejero. The club has the intention to be run democratically by its members.

On 15 August 2015, the club played its first friendly match, a 3–2 win against Club Hispano at Piedras Blancas, Castrillón, after being losing by 0–2 in the first half. On 13 September 2015, Avilés Stadium played its first official game at Campo de Santo Domingo in the parish of Miranda, its field for the first season. It defeated San Juan La Carisa by 2–0.

On 12 April 2018, Avilés Stadium announced it would merge with local farm team Avilés Deportivo, with the aim to develop its own cantera.

In 2020, despite being the league suspended due to the COVID-19 pandemic, Avilés Stadium finally promoted to Tercera División as second qualified of the Regional Preferente at the moment of the suspension.

Season to season

1 season in Tercera División

Detailed list of seasons

Stadium
Avilés Stadium played the home games of its first three seasons at Campo de Santo Domingo, in the parish of Miranda.

In 2018, the club agreed with the Town Hall to move to Estadio Muro de Zaro, in the neighbourhood of Llaranes.

Coaches
Manel Erimia and Luis Castro 2015–2016
Luis Castro 2016–2018
Luis Valera 2018–present

References

External links
 

Football clubs in Asturias
Association football clubs established in 2015
2015 establishments in Spain